Ambrose James McGann (May 1868 – February 2, 1941) was an infielder/outfielder in Major League Baseball, playing mainly at shortstop for the Louisville Colonels during the  season.

McGann was born in Baltimore, Maryland, to Andrew and Catherine McGann, who were both born in Maryland to Irish emigrants.

In one season career, McGann was a .288 hitter (21-for-73) with nine runs and nine RBI in 20 games, including  five doubles, two triples, six stolen bases, and a .358 on-base percentage.  His batting side and throwing arm are unknown.

McGann died in his homeland of Baltimore, at the age of 72.

References

External links
Baseball Reference
Retrosheet

Louisville Colonels players
19th-century baseball players
Major League Baseball infielders
Major League Baseball outfielders
Baseball players from Maryland
1868 births
1941 deaths
Date of birth missing
Lynchburg Hill Climbers players
Richmond Crows players
Norfolk Clams players
Norfolk Crows players
Portsmouth Truckers players
Roanoke Magicians players
Grand Rapids Rippers players
Grand Rapids Gold Bugs players
Galveston Sandcrabs players
American people of Irish descent